Hồ Thủy Tiên (also known as Thiên An park) is an abandoned water park in the outskirts of Huế, Vietnam that gained notoriety for its short operational period and has become a destination for urban explorers due to its dilapidated state. As of 2022, the Hue city government plans to renovate and reopen the park, with a scheduled return to operations in March 2023.

History
The park, located near Thiên An hill (already a tourist attraction for its monastery and natural environment) and the lake of the same name about ten kilometers away from the city of Huế, began construction in 2001 and was finished in 2004 by the city's state funded tourism company at a projected cost exceeding  (US$3 million). Reportedly, it was only half finished when it was constructed, but was still relatively popular when it opened. However, the park closed down after a few months. The investment company Haco Hue took over the park and reopened it in 2006, with plans to create a new eco-tourism complex, but ultimately had to shut down the park by 2011 due to a lack of business. The province again attempted to revive the park three years later, but the financial inability of Haco Hue to return to the project, compounded by the lack of progress made, led to the provincial government reclaiming the land and prohibiting entry to the premises due to safety concerns from the now-deteriorated infrastructure.

In 2016, HuffPost ran a story on the attention the park gained from backpackers and other tourists, which sparked a wider interest in the property. Visitors have described Hồ Thủy Tiên has "eerie" and "surreal" due to its abandonment and lack of regular human presence. On the other hand, it has also been considered an "off-the-beaten-path" attraction with a unique aesthetic. Despite the prohibition on entry, locals at the gate allow tourists in for a fee. Reportedly, crocodiles placed in the park while it was open continued to roam there until travelers placed pressure on animal rights organizations, causing the Vietnamese government to relocate them to a nature preserve. The park's "desolate, creepy image" has led to several artists using it as a backdrop to their music videos, including the videos for We Must Love by ONF, Bad Memories by Meduza and James Carter, and Warpaint by Niki.

In 2020, the provincial government announced plans to redevelop and connect the park, but the debt of Haco Hue provided issues for attracting investors. After spending  ($844,100) to renovate the park, the Huế city government announced it would be scheduled to reopen in March 2023.

References

Amusement parks in Vietnam